Barbara Barthel (born 9 February 1940) is a German cross-country skier. She competed in three events at the 1968 Winter Olympics.

Cross-country skiing results

Olympic Games

References

External links
 

1940 births
Living people
German female cross-country skiers
Olympic cross-country skiers of West Germany
Cross-country skiers at the 1968 Winter Olympics
Sportspeople from Wrocław